Nyceryx janzeni is a moth of the family Sphingidae. It is known from Bolivia and Brazil.

References

Nyceryx
Moths described in 2005